The Han Feizi or Hanfeizi ("[Writings of] Master Han Fei") is an ancient Chinese text named for its attribution to the political philosopher Han Fei. It comprises a selection of essays in the Legalist tradition on theories of state power, synthesizing the methodologies of his predecessors. Its 55 chapters, most of which date to the Warring States period mid-3rd century, are the only such text to survive fully intact. 

Among the most important philosophical classics in ancient China, it touches on administration, diplomacy, war and economics, and is also valuable for its abundance of anecdotes about pre-Qin China. Though differing considerably in style, the coherency of the essays lend themselves to the possibility that they were written by Han Fei himself, and are generally considered more philosophically engaging than the Book of Lord Shang. Zhuge Liang is said to have attached great importance to the Han Feizi, as well as to Han Fei's predecessor Shen Buhai.

Introduction

Dedicated to statecraft, Han Fei describes an interest-driven human nature together with the political methodologies to work with it in the interest of the state and Sovereign, namely, engaging in wu-wei (passive observation); and the setting up and systematic use of Fa (law, measurement, statistic) to maintain leadership and manage human resources, its use to increase welfare, and its relation with justice. Rather than rely too much on worthies, who might not be trustworthy, Han binds their programs (to which he makes no judgement, apart from observances of the facts) to systematic reward and penalty (the "Two Handles"), fishing the subjects of the state by feeding them with interests. That being done, the ruler minimizes his own input. Like Shang Yang and other Fa philosophers, he admonishes the ruler not to abandon Fa for any other means, considering it a more practical means for the administration of both a large territory and personnel near at hand.

Han's philosophy proceeds from the regicide of his era. Goldin writes: "Most of what appears in the Han Feizi deals with the ruler's relations with his ministers, [who] were regarded as the party most likely, in practice, to cause him harm." Han Fei quotes the Springs and Autumns of Tao Zuo: "'Less than half of all rulers die of illness.' If the ruler of men is unaware of this, disorders will be manifold and unrestrained. Thus it is said: If those who benefit from a lord's death are many, the ruler will be imperiled."

Wu wei
Devoting the entirety of Chapter 14, "How to Love the Ministers", to "persuading the ruler to be ruthless to his ministers", Han Fei's enlightened ruler strikes terror into his ministers by doing nothing (wu wei). The qualities of a ruler, his "mental power, moral excellence and physical prowess" are irrelevant. He discards his private reason and morality, and shows no personal feelings. What is important is his method of government. Fa (administrative standards) require no perfection on the part of the ruler.

Han Fei's use of wu wei may have been derivative of Taoism, but emphasizes autocracy ("Tao does not identify with anything but itself, the ruler does not identify with the ministers") and shu (technique) as arguably more of a "practical principle of political control" than any state of mind. He nonetheless begins by waiting "empty and still."

Han Fei's commentary on the Tao asserts that perspectiveless knowledge – an absolute point of view – is possible, though the chapter may have been one of his earlier writings.

Performance and title (Xing-Ming)

Han Fei was notoriously focused on what he termed xing-ming, which Sima Qian and Liu Xiang define as "holding actual outcome accountable to ming (speech)." In line with both the Confucian and Mohist rectification of names, it is relatable to the Confucian tradition in which a promise or undertaking, especially in relation to a government aim, entails punishment or reward, though the tight, centralized control emphasized by both his and his predecessor Shen Buhai's philosophy conflicts with the Confucian idea of the autonomous minister.

Possibly referring to the drafting and imposition of laws and standardized legal terms, xing-ming may originally have meant "punishments and names", but with the emphasis on the latter. It functions through binding declarations (ming), like a legal contract. Verbally committing oneself, a candidate is allotted a job, indebting him to the ruler. "Naming" people to (objectively determined) positions, it rewards or punishes according to the proposed job description and whether the results fit the task entrusted by their word, which a real minister fulfils.

Han Fei insists on the perfect congruence between words and deeds. Fitting the name is more important than results. The completion, achievement, or result of a job is its assumption of a fixed form (xing), which can then be used as a standard against the original claim (ming). A large claim but a small achievement is inappropriate to the original verbal undertaking, while a larger achievement takes credit by overstepping the bounds of office.

Han Fei's "brilliant ruler" "orders names to name themselves and affairs to settle themselves."

Assessing the accountability of his words to his deeds, the ruler attempts to "determine rewards and punishments in accordance with a subject's true merit" (using Fa). It is said that using names (ming) to demand realities (shih) exalts superiors and curbs inferiors, provides a check on the discharge of duties, and naturally results in emphasizing the high position of superiors, compelling subordinates to act in the manner of the latter.

Han Fei considers xing-ming an essential element of autocracy, saying that "In the way of assuming Oneness names are of first importance. When names are put in order, things become settled down; when they go awry, things become unfixed." He emphasizes that through this system, initially developed by Shen Buhai, uniformity of language could be developed, functions could be strictly defined to prevent conflict and corruption, and objective rules (fa) impervious to divergent interpretation could be established, judged solely by their effectiveness. By narrowing down the options to exactly one, discussions on the "right way of government" could be eliminated. Whatever the situation (shih) brings is the correct Dao.

Though recommending use of Shen Buhai's techniques, Han Fei's xing-ming is both considerably narrower and more specific. The functional dichotomy implied in Han Fei's mechanistic accountability is not readily implied in Shen's, and might be said to be more in line with the later thought of the Han dynasty linguist Xu Gan than that of either Shen Buhai or his supposed teacher Xun Kuang.

The "Two Handles"
Though not entirely accurately, most Han works identify Shang Yang with penal law. Its discussion of bureaucratic control is simplistic, chiefly advocating punishment and reward. Shang Yang was largely unconcerned with the organization of the bureaucracy apart from this. The use of these "two handles" (punishment and reward) nonetheless forms a primary premise of Han Fei's administrative theory. However, he includes it under his theory of shu (administrative techniques) in connection with xing-ming.

As a matter of illustration, if the "keeper of the hat" lays a robe on the sleeping Emperor, he has to be put to death for overstepping his office, while the "keeper of the robe" has to be put to death for failing to do his duty. The philosophy of the "Two Handles" likens the ruler to the tiger or leopard, which "overpowers other animals by its sharp teeth and claws" (rewards and punishments). Without them he is like any other man; his existence depends upon them. To "avoid any possibility of usurpation by his ministers", power and the "handles of the law" must "not be shared or divided", concentrating them in the ruler exclusively.

In practice, this means that the ruler must be isolated from his ministers. The elevation of ministers endangers the ruler, from whom he must be kept strictly apart. Punishment confirms his sovereignty; law eliminates anyone who oversteps his boundary, regardless of intention. Law "aims at abolishing the selfish element in man and the maintenance of public order", making the people responsible for their actions.

Han Fei's rare appeal (among Legalists) to the use of scholars (law and method specialists) makes him comparable to the Confucians, in that sense. The ruler cannot inspect all officials himself, and must rely on the decentralized (but faithful) application of laws and methods (fa). Contrary to Shen Buhai and his own rhetoric, Han Fei insists that loyal ministers (like Guan Zhong, Shang Yang, and Wu Qi) exist, and upon their elevation with maximum authority. Though Fa-Jia sought to enhance the power of the ruler, this scheme effectively neutralizes him, reducing his role to the maintenance of the system of reward and punishments, determined according to impartial methods and enacted by specialists expected to protect him through their usage thereof. Combining Shen Buhai's methods with Shang Yang's insurance mechanisms, Han Fei's ruler simply employs anyone offering their services.

Comparisons and views
Apart from the influence of Confucianist Xun Zi, who was his and Li Si's teacher, Han Fei wrote a commentary on the Tao Te Ching, which he interpreted as a political text. For this reason, the Han Feizi is sometimes included as part of the syncretist Huang-Lao (Taoist) tradition, seeing the Tao as a natural law that everyone and everything was forced to follow. Parallel to this, he believed that an ideal ruler made laws, like an inevitable force of nature, that the people could not resist.

Translator W. K. Liao describes the world view of Han Fei Tzŭ as "purely Taoistic", advocating a "doctrine of inaction" nonetheless followed by an "insistence on the active application of the two handles to government", this being the "difference between Han Fei Tzŭ's ideas and the teachings of the orthodox Taoists (who advocated non-action from start to finish)." Liao compares Han Fei's thought to Shang Yang, "directing his main attention... to the issues between ruler and minister... teaching the ruler how to maintain supremacy and why to weaken the minister."

 in his foreword to the Han Feizi praised Han Fei as a knowledgeable man with sharp, logical and firm arguments, supported by large amount of practical and realistic evidence. Han Fei's strict methods were appropriate in a context of social decadence. Phan Ngọc claimed that Han Fei's writings has three drawbacks, however: first, his idea of Legalism was unsuited to autocracy because a ruling dynasty will sooner or later deteriorate. Second, due to the inherent limitation of autocratic monarchy system, Han Fei did not manage to provide the solutions for all the issues that he pointed out. Third, Han Fei was wrong to think that human is inherently evil and only seeks fame and profit: there are humans who sacrificed their own profit for the greater good, including Han Fei himself.  considered the Han Feizi to be superior to Machiavelli's Prince, and claimed that Han Fei's ideology was highly refined for its era.

Although considering the Han Feizi rich and erudite, Chad Hansen views it as "more polemical than reasoned", and with unjustified assumptions. Hansen does not consider Han Fei particularly original, philosophical or ethical, being almost purely practical, with cynicism recognizable "from all self-described realists" that "rests on the familiar sneering tone of superior realistic insight."

Translations
 Liao, W. K. (1939). The Complete Works of Han Fei Tzu. London: Arthur Probsthain.
 ——— (1959). The Complete Works of Han Fei Tzu, Volume II. London: Arthur Probsthain.
 Watson, Burton (1964). Han Fei Tzu: Basic Writings. New York: Columbia University Press.

See also
Bi Fang bird

References

Footnotes

Works cited

External links

 Full text of Han Feizi in English and Classical Chinese
 Full text of Han Feizi in Classical Chinese
 
 Han Feizi 《韓非子》 Chinese text with matching English vocabulary

Legalist texts
Qin (state)